Hog Island is an island in the Aleutian Islands in Unalaska Bay of Unalaska Island.

History 
The name originally comes from Captain Tebenkov, a Russian captain. It was first published as (Ostrov) Svinoy when Russians places hogs on the island.

References

External links
 

Islands of Alaska
Islands of Aleutians West Census Area, Alaska
Islands of the Aleutian Islands
Islands of Unorganized Borough, Alaska